Eslohe is a municipality in the Hochsauerland district, in North Rhine-Westphalia, Germany.

Geography
Eslohe is situated approximately 25 km south-west of Meschede.

Neighbouring municipalities
 Finnentrop
 Lennestadt
 Meschede
 Schmallenberg
 Sundern

Division of the town 
After the local government reforms of 1975 Eslohe consists of the following districts:

Twin towns
  Kisbér (Hungary)

Notable people 

 Georg Milbradt (born 1945), politician (CDU)

References

External links
 Official site 

Hochsauerlandkreis